The European Squash Federation (ESF) was set up in 1973 in order to develop and promote squash across Europe. It is based in Barston, West Midlands, in England. In 2011 it had 43 member federations.

Presidents

List of members

Events
Junior Events
European Junior Championships Under 19
Under 15 and 17 Team Championships 
European Junior Circuit 

Seniors' Events
European Squash Individual Championships 
European Squash Team Championships 
European Club Championships 

Masters' Events
European Masters Individual Championships

References

External links
 European Squash Federation official website

Squash organizations
Squash in Europe
Squash
World Squash Federation
1973 establishments in Europe
Sports organizations established in 1973
Organisations based in the West Midlands (county)